NFL GameDay 2002 is the seventh video game in the NFL GameDay series. It was developed by 989 Sports and Red Zone Interactive and published Sony Computer Entertainment America for the PlayStation and the PlayStation 2 in 2001. On the cover is Donovan McNabb.

Reception

The game received "mixed" reviews on both platforms according to the review aggregation website Metacritic, though the PlayStation version was a little more well-received than the PlayStation 2 version. Jim Preston of NextGen said that the former console version "restores some of the shine to the franchise."

References

External links
 

2001 video games
NFL GameDay video games
North America-exclusive video games
PlayStation (console) games
PlayStation 2 games
Video games developed in the United States
Video games set in 2002